Qala Waxrani (Aymara qala stone, waxra horn, -ni a suffix to indicate ownership, "the one with a stone horn", also spelled Khalawajrani) is a   mountain in the Chilla-Kimsa Chata mountain range in the Andes of Bolivia. It is situated in the La Paz Department, Ingavi Province, Guaqui Municipality, south-east of Guaqui.

References 

Mountains of La Paz Department (Bolivia)